Hasan al-Rammah (died 1295) was a Syrian Arab chemist and engineer during the Mamluk Sultanate who studied gunpowders and explosives, and sketched prototype instruments of warfare, including the first torpedo. Al-Rammah called his early torpedo "an egg which moves itself and burns." It was made of two sheet-pans of metal fastened together and filled with naphtha, metal filings, and potassium nitrate. It was intended to move across the surface of the water, propelled by a large rocket and kept on course by a small rudder.

Al-Rammah devised several new types of gunpowder and a new type of fuse and two types of lighters.

References 

Syrian engineers
1295 deaths
Date of birth unknown
Year of birth unknown
13th-century engineers
Engineers of the medieval Islamic world
Inventors of the medieval Islamic world
Alchemists of the medieval Islamic world
13th-century Arabs